The 76th annual Venice International Film Festival was held from 28 August to 7 September 2019. Film director Lucrecia Martel was appointed as the President of the Jury. The Truth, directed by Hirokazu Kore-eda, was selected to open the festival. The Golden Lion was awarded to Joker, directed by Todd Phillips.

Jury
Main Competition (Venezia 76)
 Lucrecia Martel, Argentine director and screenwriter (Jury President)
 Piers Handling, Canadian film historian and critic, executive director of the Toronto International Film Festival
 Mary Harron, Canadian director
 Stacy Martin, French actress
 Rodrigo Prieto, Mexican cinematographer
 Shinya Tsukamoto, Japanese filmmaker and actor
 Paolo Virzì, Italian director and screenwriter

Horizons
 Susanna Nicchiarelli, Italian director and screenwriter (Jury President)
 Mark Adams, artistic director of the Edinburgh International Film Festival
 Rachid Bouchareb, French filmmaker
 Álvaro Brechner, Uruguayan filmmaker
 Eva Sangiorgi, artistic director of the Vienna International Film Festival

Luigi De Laurentiis Award for a Debut Film
 Emir Kusturica, Serbian director, screenwriter and actor (Jury President)
 Antonietta De Lillo, Italian director and screenwriter
 Hend Sabry, Tunisian actress
 Michael J. Werner, American-Hongkongese film producer
 Terence Nance, American filmmaker

Venice Virtual Reality
 Laurie Anderson, American composer, artist and director (Jury President)
 Francesco Carrozzini, Italian photographer 
 Alysha Naples, Italian designer

Venice Classics
 Costanza Quatriglio, Italian director and screenwriter

Official selection

In Competition
The following films were selected for the main international competition:

Highlighted title indicates Golden Lion winner.

Out of competition
The following films were selected to be screened out of competition:

Horizons
The following films were selected for the Horizons section:

Highlighted titles indicate Horizons Prizes for Best Feature Film and Best Short Film respectively.

Venice Classics
The following films were selected to be screened in the Venice Classics section:

Highlighted titles indicate the Best Restored Film and Best Documentary on Cinema official awards respectively.

Sconfini 
The following films were selected for the Sconfini section:

Autonomous sections

International Critics' Week
The following films were selected for the 34th Venice International Critics' Week:

Giornate degli Autori
The following films were selected for the 16th edition of the Giornate degli Autori section:

Awards

Official selection
The following official awards were presented at the 76th edition:

In Competition
Golden Lion: Joker by Todd Phillips
Grand Jury Prize: An Officer and a Spy, by Roman Polanski
Silver Lion: Roy Andersson for About Endlessness
Volpi Cup for Best Actress: Ariane Ascaride for Gloria Mundi
Volpi Cup for Best Actor: Luca Marinelli for Martin Eden
 Best Screenplay Award: No.7 Cherry Lane, by Yonfan
Special Jury Prize: The Mafia Is No Longer What It Used to Be by Franco Maresco
Marcello Mastroianni Award: Toby Wallace, Babyteeth

Horizons (Orizzonti)
Best Film: Atlantis by Valentyn Vasyanovych
Best Director: Théo Court for White on White
Special Jury Prize: Verdict by Raymund Ribas Gutierrez
Best Actress: Marta Nieto for Madre
Best Actor: Sami Bouajila for A Son
Best Screenplay: Revenir by Jessica Palud
Horizons Prize for Best Short: Darling by Saim Sadiq

Lion of the Future
Luigi De Laurentiis Award for a Debut Film: You Will Die at Twenty by Amjad Abu Alala

Venezia Classici Awards
Best Documentary on Cinema: Babenco: Tell Me When I Die
Best Restored Film: Ecstasy (1933)

Special Awards
Golden Lion For Lifetime Achievement: Pedro Almodóvar and Julie Andrews

Autonomous sections
The following collateral awards were conferred to films of the autonomous sections:

Giornate degli Autori
 SIAE Award: Marco Bellocchio for  The Traitor
 GdA Director's Award: La Llorona by Jayro Bustamante
 Europa Cinemas Label: Corpus Christi by Jan Komasa

Autonomous awards

 Fondazione Mimmo Rotella Award: Donald Sutherland and Mick Jagger for The Burnt Orange Heresy
 Campari Passion for the Cinema Award: Luca Bigazzi for The New Pope
 Bresson Award: Lucrecia Martel

References

External links
 

2019 film festivals
2019 in Italian cinema
August 2019 events in Italy
September 2019 events in Italy
76
Film